is a subway station in Shinjuku, Tokyo, Japan. Its station number is E-05. The station is near  Kagurazaka.

Line
  Toei Ōedo Line

Platforms
The station consists of an island platform serving two tracks.

Ridership
In 2018, the station saw an average daily usage of 15,237 passengers.

Surroundings
Tully's Coffee Kagurasaka branch
Eiken Foundation of Japan
Toei Animation
Obunsha Co., Ltd.
Shinchosha Publishing Co, Ltd.
Tokyo Metropolitan Senior High School of the Arts
Michio Miyagi Memorial Hall
Office of the Chief Justice of Japan

References

This article incorporates information from the corresponding article on the Japanese Wikipedia.

Railway stations in Japan opened in 2000
Railway stations in Tokyo